National Road 76 (abbreviated as EO76) is a single carriageway road in southern Greece. It connects the Greek National Road 9 near Krestena with Megalopoli, via Andritsaina and Karytaina. It runs through the western and the central part of the Peloponnese, in the regional units Elis and Arcadia.

Route
The western terminus of the GR-76 is 2 km west of Krestena, where it branches off the GR-9. It runs through the mountains of southern Elis and southwestern Arcadia, passing through the towns Andritsaina and Karytaina. It ends in Megalopoli, where it is connected with the GR-7.

National Road 76 passes through the following places:

Krestena
Chani Gryllou
Graikas
Platiana
Kallithea
Andritsaina 
Theisoa
Karytaina
Katsimpalis
Megalopoli

76
Roads in Peloponnese (region)
Roads in Western Greece